This is a List of World Championships medalists in women's weightlifting.

Flyweight
 44 kg: 1987–1992
 46 kg: 1993–1997
 48 kg: 1998–2017
 45 kg: 2018–

Bantamweight
 48 kg: 1987–1992
 50 kg: 1993–1997
 49 kg: 2018–

Featherweight
 52 kg: 1987–1992
 54 kg: 1993–1997
 53 kg: 1998–2017
 55 kg: 2018–

Lightweight
 56 kg: 1987–1992
 59 kg: 1993–1997
 58 kg: 1998–2017
 59 kg: 2018–

Middleweight
 60 kg: 1987–1992
 64 kg: 1993–1997
 63 kg: 1998–2017
 64 kg: 2018–

Light heavyweight
 67.5 kg: 1987–1992
 70 kg: 1993–1997
 69 kg: 1998–2017
 71 kg: 2018–

Middle heavyweight
 75 kg: 1987–1992
 76 kg: 1993–1997
 75 kg: 1998–2017
 76 kg: 2018–

First heavyweight
 81 kg: 2018–

Heavyweight
 82.5 kg: 1987–1992
 83 kg: 1993–1997
 90 kg: 2017
 87 kg: 2018–

Super heavyweight
 +82.5 kg: 1987–1992
 +83 kg: 1993–1997
 +75 kg: 1998–2015
 +90 kg: 2017
 +87 kg: 2018–

Medal table

 Names in italic are national entities that no longer exist.

See also
List of Olympic medalists in weightlifting

References
Weightlifting World Championships Seniors Statistics 
IWF Results

Medalists
World Championships women
World Championships women
Weightlifting
World Weightlifting Championships medalists
Lists of sportswomen